The Night Rider is a 1932 American Pre-Code Western film directed by Fred C. Newmeyer and William Nigh.

Cast
Harry Carey as John Brown posing as Jim Blake
Elinor Fair as Barbara Rogers
George "Gabby" Hayes as Altoonie
Julian Rivero as Manuel Alonzo Valdez
J. Carlton Wetherby as Dan Rogers
Nadja as Tula, a Saloon Dancer
Tom London as Jeff Barton
Walter Shumway as Sheriff Lynn Ricker
Bob Kortman as Steve
Cliff Lyons as Bert Logan

External links

1932 films
1932 Western (genre) films
American black-and-white films
American Western (genre) films
Films with screenplays by Harry L. Fraser
Films directed by William Nigh
Films directed by Fred C. Newmeyer
1930s English-language films
1930s American films